Castelvetrano Airfield is a decommissioned World War II military airfield in Sicily which is located approximately 1 km southwest of Castelvetrano.  The airfield had been an Italian Air Force (Regia Aeronautica), seized by the United States Army during the Invasion of Sicily (Operation Husky), and used as part of Sicilian Campaign and the Allied Invasion of Italy in 1943.

History
When the Axis Forces were driven out of Cyrenaica during Operation Crusader in December 1941, they could no longer fly in supplies from Crete to Derna. Instead, the Regia Aeronautica and German Luftwaffe began flying transport missions from airfields in Sicily, including Castelvetrano. On 4 January 1942 Castelvetrano was attacked by a force of Royal Air Force Blenheim IV bombers flying from Luqa airfield on Malta, which caught 75 aircraft 'parked wing-tip to wing-tip ... the airfield was left a smoking ruin'. That night Wellington IC bombers from Luqa added to the damage.

After its capture the airfield was primarily used by the United States Army Air Force Twelfth Air Force units:

 81st Fighter Group, 12 October - February 1944, P-39 Airacobra
 314th Troop Carrier Group, September 1943-February 1944, C-47 Skytrain

When the Americans moved out, the airfield was closed and dismantled. Today, the main runway of the airfield is clearly visible in aerial photography but no structures of other components of the airfield remain.

Notes

References

 Maurer, Maurer. Air Force Combat Units of World War II. Maxwell AFB, Alabama: Office of Air Force History, 1983. .
 
 Maj-Gen I.S.O. Playfair, History of the Second World War, United Kingdom Military Series: The Mediterranean and Middle East, Vol III: (September 1941 to September 1942) British Fortunes reach their Lowest Ebb, London: HMSO, 1960 /Uckfield, Naval & Military Press, 2004,

External links

Airports in Sicily
Airfield
Airfields of the United States Army Air Forces in Italy